This is a list of episodes from the anime Danball Senki, its sequel series Little Battlers eXperience W, and the final chapter in  Little Battlers eXperience Wars. It also contains the list of Danball Senki dubbed episodes, LBX: Little Battlers Experience, which is listed separately due to the number of edits, episode deletions, and episode merges (44 to 26).

Japanese

Little Battlers eXperience (2011–12) 
Opening themes
 "1 Dream!!" by Little Blue boX (eps. 1–24)
 "Ishin Denshin (以心伝心)" by Little Blue boX (eps. 25–44)
Ending themes
 "Boku no Chokinbako" (僕の貯金箱) by Hiroki Maekawa (eps. 1–24)
 "Himitsu Kichi" (ヒミツキチ) by Hiroki Maekawa (eps. 25–44)

Little Battlers eXperience W (2012–13) 
The W in the title is pronounced double.
Opening themes
 "BRAVE HERO" by Little Blue boX (eps 1–16)
 "Sanmi Ittai" by Little Blue boX (eps 17–34)
 "2 Spirits" by Little Blue boX (eps 35–45)
 "Telepathy" by Little Blue boX (eps 46–58)
Ending themes
 "Do Wak Parappa" by Hiroki Maekawa (eps 1–16)
 "Me wo Tojite..." by Hiroki Maekawa (eps 17–34)
 "Umare Kawattemo Boku de Ii yo" by Hiroki Maekawa (eps 35–45)
 "Chikyū no kizuna" (地球の絆) by Dream5 (eps 46–57)

Inazuma Eleven Go vs. Little Battlers eXperience W The Movie (2012)

Little Battlers eXperience Wars (2013) 
Opening themes
 "Mugen Myself" by Little Blue boX (eps 1–21)
 "Eternal" by Little Blue boX (eps 22–37)
Ending themes
 "Kamisama Yāyāyā" by Dream5 (eps 1–21)
 "Bokutachi no Wars" by Ryota Ohsaka, Sayori Ishizuka, and Tomoaki Maeno (eps 22–36)
 "Hirameki" by Ryota Ohsaka (ep 37)

Little Battlers eXperience Wars Special (2014)

LBX Girls (2021) 
Opening theme
 "Dream hopper" by Rikako Aida
Ending theme
  by Kano

English

LBX: Little Battlers eXperience (2014–16)

Season 1 (2014–15) 
Ending theme
 "Battle On" by Mike Twining & Andrew Twining

Season 2 (2015–16) 
Ending theme
 "Save the World" by Mike Twining & Andrew Twining

Notes

References 

Danball Senki